Fabien Horth (born 20 July 1985) is a retired French swimmer who won a bronze medal in the 4×200 m freestyle relay at the 2004 European Aquatics Championships. He finished seventh in the same event at the 2004 Summer Olympics.

He retired in 2011 to focus on his physiotherapy education at the Hôpital l'Archet in Nice.

References

External links
Personal website
Personal website (images)

1985 births
Living people
Swimmers at the 2004 Summer Olympics
Olympic swimmers of France
French male freestyle swimmers
European Aquatics Championships medalists in swimming
21st-century French people